Patricia Torres Ray (born March 25, 1964) is a Colombian-American politician and former member of the Minnesota Senate. A member of the Minnesota Democratic–Farmer–Labor Party (DFL), she represented District 63, which includes portions of southeastern Minneapolis and eastern Richfield in Hennepin County in the Twin Cities metropolitan area. She is the first Latina woman to serve in the Minnesota Senate. She ran for Congress in Minnesota's 5th district in 2018 to succeed Congressman Keith Ellison, but lost the primary to Ilhan Omar. In November 2021, she announced that she would not run for reelection in 2022.

Education
Torres Ray studied at the University of Minnesota, earning a B.A. in urban studies and a MPA from the Humphrey Institute in 2004.

Minnesota Senate
Torres Ray was first elected in 2006, succeeding retiring Wes Skoglund. She was reelected in 2010, 2012, 2016, and 2020. Torres Ray's legislative concerns included education, health and human services, the environment, and economic development.

2010 lieutenant gubernatorial campaign
On March 31, 2010, state senator and 2010 Minnesota gubernatorial candidate John Marty announced that Torres Ray would be his running mate for lieutenant governor. The team withdrew from the race at the 2010 DFL State Convention.

2018 Congressional campaign

On June 5, 2018, Torres Ray filed to run for the 5th district congressional seat previously held by Keith Ellison. Her platform focused on public education, immigration, and climate change. The primary election was held on August 14, with State Representative Ilhan Omar receiving a plurality of votes to advance to the general election.

Electoral history

Minnesota Senate 63rd district election, 2020
Patricia Torres Ray (DFL), 40,742 (77.64%)
Diane Napper (R), 8,231 (15.69%)
Chris Wright (Grassroots-Legalize Cannabis) 3,460 (6.59%)
Minnesota Senate 63rd district election, 2016
Patricia Torres Ray (DFL), 38,470 (80.70%)
Ron Moey (R), 9068, (19.02%)
Write-in, 135 (0.28%)
Minnesota Senate 63rd district election, 2012
Patricia Torres Ray (DFL), 36,866 (80.81%)
Patrick Marron (R), 8,636 (18.93%)
Write-in, 117 (0.26%)
Minnesota Senate 62nd district election, 2010
Patricia Torres Ray (DFL), 26,671 (79.64%)
Patrick Elgin (R), 6,751 (20.16%)
Write-in, 68 (0.20%)
Minnesota Senate 62nd district election, 2006
Patricia Torres Ray (DFL), 28,787 (81.25%)
Dan Mathias (R), 6,569 (18.54%)
Write-in, 76 (0.21%)

Personal life
Torres Ray met her husband, Jack, when he was a University of Minnesota student in Colombia for a study abroad internship. They married in 1987. She then immigrated to Minnesota with him, learned English, and became a U.S. citizen.

She and Jack have two sons.

References

External links 

Senator Patricia Torres Ray official Minnesota Senate website
Patricia Torres Ray for Congress congressional campaign website
Minnesota Public Radio - Votetracker: Patricia Torres Ray Voting Record
Project Vote Smart - Senator Patricia Torres Ray Profile

Democratic Party Minnesota state senators
1964 births
Living people
University of Minnesota College of Liberal Arts alumni
Politicians from Minneapolis
Women state legislators in Minnesota
Hispanic and Latino American women in politics
Colombian emigrants to the United States
People from Pasto, Colombia
American politicians of Colombian descent
21st-century American politicians
21st-century American women politicians
Humphrey School of Public Affairs alumni